Dawkins is an English surname.

It may refer to:

 Aubrey Dawkins (born 1995), American basketball player
 Ben Dawkins, Australian politician
 Benjamin C. Dawkins Jr. (1911–1984), US District Judge in Louisiana
 Benjamin C. Dawkins Sr. (1881–1966), US District Judge in Louisiana
 Boyd Dawkins (full name Maynard Boyd Dawkins; 1917–1966) South Australian sheep breeder and politician
 Brian Dawkins (born 1973), American football Safety for the Philadelphia Eagles and Denver Broncos
 Cecil Dawkins (born 1927), North American author, also known for her personal correspondence with Flannery O'Connor
 Sir Clinton Edward Dawkins (1859–1905), British businessman and civil servant
 Dalyn Dawkins (born 1994), American football player
 Darryl Dawkins (1957–2015), American basketball player and coach
 Derek Dawkins (born 1959), English footballer
 Dion Dawkins (born 1994), American football player
 Egbert Nathaniel Dawkins III (b. 1979) a.k.a. Aloe Blacc, American soul singer and musician
 James Dawkins (antiquarian) (1722, Jamaica – 6 September 1757, Sutton's Plantation, Jamaica) was a British antiquarian and Jacobite.
 Jimmy Dawkins, (1936–2013) Chicago blues musician
 John Sydney "Joe" Dawkins (born 1947), Australian politician, instigator of educational reforms known as the Dawkins Revolution
 John Dawkins (b. 1954), Australian politician, member of South Australian Legislative Council
 Johnny Dawkins (born 1963), American basketball player and coach
 Marian Dawkins (born 1945), professor of animal behaviour at Oxford, ex-wife of Richard Dawkins
 Marvin Dawkins a.k.a. MC Romeo (born 1980), British garage music MC and member of So Solid Crew
 Noah Dawkins (born 1997), American football player
 Paul Dawkins (1957–2019), American-Turkish basketball player
 Peter Dawkins (musician) (born 1946), New Zealand record producer and musician
 Pete Dawkins (Peter Miller Dawkins, born 1938), former US Army Brigadier General and vice chairman of Citigroup Private Bank
 Richard Dawkins (born 1941), ethologist, evolutionary biologist and noted atheist
 Richard MacGillivray Dawkins (1871–1955), British archaeologist
 Riley Collier-Dawkins (born 2000), Australian football player
 Sean Dawkins (born 1971), American football player
 Travis Dawkins (born 1979), baseball player
 William Boyd Dawkins (1837–1929), British geologist and archaeologist

Fictional characters
 Gordon Dawkins, a.k.a. Moe Szyslak, character in The Simpsons
 Jack Dawkins a.k.a. The Artful Dodger, in Charles Dickens' novel Oliver Twist
 Hugh Dawkins, alter ego of Tasmanian Devil in the DC Comics universe
 Cassius Dawkins is a prisoner and a reoccurring character on the ABC series For Life, played by 50 Cent.

English-language surnames
Patronymic surnames
Surnames from given names